The Sumter and Wateree River Railroad was a shortline South Carolina railroad operated by the South Carolina and Georgia Railroad system, beginning in 1899.

The Sumter and Wateree River Railroad was a 16-mile route that stretched from Sumter, South Carolina, to Middleton, South Carolina.

The line was sold to Southern Railway's Carolina Division at the end of 1902.

References

Defunct South Carolina railroads
Railway companies disestablished in 1902
Railway companies established in 1899
1899 establishments in South Carolina